Giovanni Fabrizio Bignami (10 April 1944 – 24 May 2017) was an Italian physicist. From March 2007 until August 2008, he was Chairman of the Italian Space Agency. Between 2010 and 2014, he was the first Italian to chair the Committee on Space Research (COSPAR), and from 2011 until 2015, he was President of INAF. He was also the chairman of the SKA project. He was married to fellow Italian astrophysicist Patrizia A. Caraveo.

Career
Bignami graduated from the University of Milan in 1968 with a degree in physics. From 1988 to 1997, he was the Principal Investigator for the European Space Agency's XMM-Newton mission, and was a professor of astronomy and astrophysics at the IUSS Pavia in Pavia. He is most known for his discovery of the neutron star Geminga. From 2004 to 2007, he was President of the Space Science Advisory Committee (SSAC) of the European Space Agency, and from 2007 to 2008, he was Chairman of the Italian Space Agency. Bignami stood as a Democratic Party candidate for Lombardy, Piedmont, Valle d'Aosta and Liguria in the 2009 European Parliament election. His campaign slogan was "Più ricerca in Italia, più futuro in Europa" ("More research in Italy and Europe.") He was not elected. In 2010, he was elected President of the Committee on Space Research (COSPAR), the first Italian to do so. He held the post until 2014. From 2011 until 2015, Bignami was also President of INAF.

Bignami received several honours, including the Bruno Rossi Prize from the American Astronomical Society, the Blaise Pascal Medal for Astrophysics from the European Academy of Sciences and the Von Karman Award from the International Academy of Astronautics. He also was named Officier of the Légion d’Honneur and the Ordre national du Mérite, and member of the Accademia dei Lincei and of the French Academy of Sciences.

Bignami died on 24 May 2017 in Madrid, Spain.

Works
 (it) La storia nello spazio, Milan, Mursia, 2001, .
 (it) L'esplorazione dello spazio. Alla scoperta del sistema solare, Bologna, Il Mulino, 2006, .
 (it) I marziani siamo noi. Un filo rosso dal Big Bang alla vita, Bologna, Zanichelli, 2010, . Translated into English as We are the Martians, Springer, Berlin, 2012
 (it) Cosa resta da scoprire, Milano, Mondadori, 2011, . Ristampato nel 2012 nella serie bestseller “Oscar”. Translated into English as Imminent Science, Springer, 2014
 (it) G. Bignami-Cristina Bellon, Il futuro spiegato ai ragazzi, Milano, Mondadori, 2012, .
 (it) Il mistero delle sette sfere. Cosa resta da esplorare. Dalla depressione di Afar alle stelle più vicine, Milano, Mondadori, 2013, . Translated into English as The Mystery of the Seven Spheres, Springer, 2015
 A Scenario for Interstellar Exploration and Its Financing, Heidelberg, Springer Verlag, 2013, .
 (it) G. Bignami-Andrea Sommariva, Oro dagli asteroidi e asparagi da Marte. Realtà e miti dell'esplorazione dello spazio, Milan, Mondadori University, 2015, .
 G. Bignami-Andrea Sommariva, The Future of Human Space Exploration, Macmillan, 2016.

References

1944 births
2017 deaths
People from Desio
Italian astrophysicists
Members of the French Academy of Sciences
Officiers of the Légion d'honneur
Officers of the Ordre national du Mérite
University of Milan alumni